Benjamin Donald McCready (born August 14, 1951) is an American portrait painter.

Ben McCready was born in Ann Arbor, Michigan. He has painted more than 600 commissioned portraits. Notable portrait clients include President Gerald R. Ford, President Ronald W. Reagan, President George H. W. Bush, President James Earl Carter, Robert Redford, George Clooney, Mr. and Mrs. Kirk Douglas, US Open/Wimbledon tennis champion Lleyton Hewitt, Mark McCormack (founder/chairman, IMG), Wayne Gretzky, U.S. Senate Majority Leader Howard Baker, U.S. Congressman Robert Kastenmeier, J. Peter Grace, John Dorrance, President Robben Fleming (University of Michigan), President Derek Bok (Harvard University), and President Harlan Hatcher (University of Michigan).

McCready has been married to Anne Gray since 1985. They live in Madison, Wisconsin.

References

External links
Website

20th-century American painters
American male painters
21st-century American painters
21st-century American male artists
American portrait painters
1951 births
Living people
People from Whitewater, Wisconsin
Artists from Ann Arbor, Michigan
20th-century American male artists